"Download" is a promotional single by American rapper Lil' Kim. It features R&B singers T-Pain and Charlie Wilson and was written by Lil' Kim and T-Pain and produced by Trackmasters. The song samples "Computer Love" by Zapp. It peaked at number 21 on the Billboard Hot R&B/Hip-Hop Songs chart.

Music video

The video (Directed by Dale Resteghini) was shot on March 27, 2009, but T-Pain was unable to attend due to being in a golf cart accident that same day. The video was released on May 3, 2009 via Kim's MySpace and features Charlie Wilson as well as T-Pain, but in an animated form. Also, LisaRaye McCoy, Derek Hough, Khamani Griffin, & Lil B (For The Love Of Ray J) make cameos. The video ranked at #84 on BET's Notarized: Top 100 Videos of 2009 countdown.

Remix
The official remix to the song features T-Pain, Charlie Wilson, The-Dream, & Soulja Boy Tell 'Em, it was leaked on the internet July 30, 2009. There is a leaked version of the remix that featured Soulja Boy with the 3 artists from the original version, that version was leaked on July 17, 2009. The remix's digital download was released on August 25, 2009.

Formats and track listings
US Promo CD
(Released: (April 2009)
 "Download" (Radio edit) – 4:29
 "Download" (Main) – 4:30
 "Download" (Instrumental) – 4:32
 "Download" (Acapella) – 3:50
 "Download" (Original) – 4:30
Digital download
(Released: April 2009)
 "Download" – 4:30

Chart performance

Weekly charts

Year-end charts

Release history

References

2009 singles
Charlie Wilson (singer) songs
T-Pain songs
Lil' Kim songs
Song recordings produced by T-Pain
Songs written by T-Pain
2009 songs
Song recordings produced by Trackmasters
Songs written by Lil' Kim
Music videos directed by Dale Resteghini